Roman Anatoliyovych Bezus (born 26 September 1990) is a Ukrainian professional footballer who plays as a second striker or as an attacking midfielder for Omonia in the Cypriot First Division.

Club career
On 10 January 2015, Bezus moved to Dnipro from Dynamo Kyiv. In 2012, Bezus was awarded the prize for the best rookie of the year.

On 12 July 2016, he signed a one-year deal with Belgian Sint-Truiden.

On 25 January 2019, Bezus signed a deal for three and a half years with Belgian Gent.

On 6 August 2022, Bezus signed with Cypriot club Omonia.

International career
Bezus was called up to Ukraine U21 for a friendly match against Cyprus on 3 March 2010, but was not selected for game. He made his debut in a friendly match against the Czech Republic on 17 November 2010.

On 11 November 2011, Bezus made his debut for the senior Ukraine national team in a friendly match against Germany. On 14 November 2019, he scored a winning goal for Ukraine in the friendly game against Estonia.

Career statistics

Club

International goals
Scores and results list Ukraine's goal tally first, score column indicates score after each Bezus goal.

Honours
Vorskla Poltava
Ukrainian Cup: 2009–10

Dynamo Kyiv
Ukrainian Premier League: 2014–15
Ukrainian Cup: 2013–14, 2014–15

FC Dnipro Dnipropetrovsk
UEFA Europa League: runner-up 2014–15

Gent
Belgian Cup: 2021–22

References

External links
 
 
 Official Website Profile
 
 

1990 births
Living people
People from Kremenchuk
Association football forwards
Association football midfielders
Ukrainian footballers
FC Kremin Kremenchuk players
FC Vorskla Poltava players
FC Dynamo Kyiv players
FC Dnipro players
Ukrainian Premier League players
Ukrainian Second League players
Sint-Truidense V.V. players
K.A.A. Gent players
Belgian Pro League players
AC Omonia players
Ukraine youth international footballers
Ukraine under-21 international footballers
Ukraine international footballers
UEFA Euro 2020 players
Ukrainian expatriate footballers
Expatriate footballers in Belgium
Ukrainian expatriate sportspeople in Belgium
Expatriate footballers in Cyprus
Ukrainian expatriate sportspeople in Cyprus
Sportspeople from Poltava Oblast